Onychostoma barbatum is a species of cyprinid in the genus Onychostoma that inhabits inland wetlands in Guangxi, Guangdong and Hunan, China.

References

barbatum
Cyprinid fish of Asia
Freshwater fish of China
Fish described in 1931